Harald Kloser (born 9 July 1956) is an Austrian film composer, producer and screenwriter. Since his critical and commercial breakthrough in 2005, in which he won the BMI Film Music Award for both of his scores for Alien vs. Predator and The Day After Tomorrow, he has become a regular collaborator of the latter's director, Roland Emmerich, having composed music for every one of the director's films since 2004, excluding Stonewall (2015). Out of those films, all but Anonymous (2011) have been collaborations with fellow composer Thomas Wander.

Besides composing original scores, Kloser has also produced and co-written several films with Emmerich, starting with 10,000 BC (2008), which Emmerich invited Kloser to write after liking the story changes Kloser proposed to The Day After Tomorrow.

Kloser was married to Désirée Nosbusch, and the couple's children Lennon and Luka are also musicians. He has since entered into a relationship with Ana Maria Lombo, best known as part of girl group Eden's Crush.

Filmography

References

External links

1956 births
Austrian film score composers
Austrian film producers
Austrian screenwriters
Living people
Male film score composers
Austrian male screenwriters
Varèse Sarabande Records artists